Total M&S Uganda (TMSU) is a petroleum products marketing, distribution, and services company in Uganda. It is a subsidiary of Total S.A., the multinational oil, gas, and petrochemical conglomerate, headquartered in Paris, France. It is not to be confused with another Ugandan subsidiary, Total E&P Uganda, which is responsible for exploration and production and has been in the country since 2010.

Location
The headquarters of the company are in the industrial area of Kampala, the capital and largest city of Uganda, at 4 Eighth Street. The coordinates of the company head offices are 0°18'49.0"N, 32°35'54.0"E (Latitude:0.313597; Longitude:32.598324).

Operations
In June 2016, Total SA acquired the assets and liabilities of Gapco Limited, a petroleum products company that was operating in Kenya, Tanzania, and Uganda. Following that transaction, Total M&S Uganda acquired 37 new fuel service stations, bringing the total number of fuel stations it operates in the country to 162, the highest owned by any fuel marketing and distribution company in the country.

Partnership
In September 2016, Total M&S Uganda signed a partnership agreement with Good African Coffee (GAC), a Ugandan coffee processing company, where GAC will exclusively sell instant, roast, and ground coffee at Total Uganda's 125 service stations countrywide. GAC buys raw coffee from least 14,000 farmers, which it markets locally and in two British supermarket chains, Sainsbury's and Waitrose.

See also

Uganda Oil Refinery
Uganda National Oil Company
Uganda-Tanzania Crude Oil Pipeline

References

External links

Retail companies established in 1955
Oil and gas companies of Uganda
1955 establishments in Uganda